An aircraft fairing is a structure whose primary function is to produce a smooth outline and reduce drag.

These structures are covers for gaps and spaces between parts of an aircraft to reduce form drag and interference drag, and to improve appearance.

Types
On aircraft, fairings are commonly found on:
 Belly fairing
 Also called a "ventral fairing", it is located on the underside of the fuselage between the main wings. It can also cover additional cargo storage or fuel tanks.
 Cockpit fairing
 Also called a "cockpit pod", it protects the crew on ultralight trikes. Commonly made from fiberglass, it may also incorporate a windshield.
 Elevator and horizontal stabilizer tips
 Elevator and stabilizer tips fairings smooth out airflow at the tips.
 Fin and rudder tip fairings Fin and rudder tip fairings reduce drag at low angles of attack, but also reduce the stall angle, so the fairing of control surface tips depends on the application.
 Fillets Fillets smooth the airflow at the junction between two components like the fuselage and wing.
 Fixed landing gear junctions
 Landing gear fairings reduce drag at these junctions.
 Flap track fairings
 Fairings are needed to enclose the flap operating mechanism when the flap is up. They open up as the flap comes down and may also pivot to allow the necessary sideways movement of the extending mechanism which occurs on swept-wing installations.
 Spinner
 To protect and streamline the propeller hub.
 Strut-to-wing and strut-to-fuselage junctions
 Strut end fairings reduce drag at these junctions.
 Tail cones
 Tail cones streamline the rear extremity of a fuselage by eliminating any base area which is the source of base drag.
 Wing root
 Wing roots are often faired to reduce interference drag between the wing and the fuselage. On top and below the wing it consists of small rounded edge to reduce the surface and such friction drag. At the leading and trailing edge it consists of much larger taper and smooths out the pressure differences: High pressure at the leading and trailing edge, low pressure on top of the wing and around the fuselage.

 Wing tips
 Wing tips are often formed as complex shapes to reduce vortex generation and so also drag, especially at low speed.
 Wheels on fixed gear aircraft
 Wheel fairings are often called "wheel pants", "speed fairings" in North America or "wheel spats" or "trousers", in the United Kingdom, the latter enclosing both the wheel and landing gear leg. These fairings are a trade-off in advantages, as they increase the frontal and surface area, but also provide a smooth surface, a faired nose and tail for laminar flow, in an attempt to reduce the turbulence created by the round wheel and its associated gear legs and brakes.  They also have the important function of preventing mud and stones from being thrown upwards against the wings or fuselage, or into the propeller on a pusher craft.

See also
 Bicycle fairing
 Motorcycle fairing
 Payload fairing

References

Aircraft components